Witch Way may refer to:

"Witch Way Now?", episode of American TV series Charmed
The Witch Way, long-standing bus route in England